DENN1B is a human gene, located on chromosome 1. The gene is hypothesized by Danish scientists Klaus Bønnelykke and Hans Bisgaard to be related to asthma.

References 

Genes on human chromosome 1